Agama cristata, the insular agama, is a species of lizard in the family Agamidae. It is a small lizard found in Mali and Guinea.

References

Agama (genus)
Reptiles described in 1905
Taxa named by François Mocquard